The Brighton Central School District is a public school district in New York State that serves approximately 3,800 students in portions of the towns of Brighton and Pittsford in Monroe County. In 2022, the district had over 650 employees and an operating budget of $87,686,048. The average class size was 20 students.

Board of education
The board of education has seven elected members. Members serve overlapping three-year terms with two or three seats up for election each year.

Schools
Council Rock Primary School (CRPS) Grades K-2, 623 students
French Road Elementary School (FRES) Grades 3–5, 697 students
Twelve Corners Middle School (TCMS) Grades 6–8, 831 students
Brighton High School (BHS) Grades 9–12, 1,227 students

See also
List of school districts in New York

References

External links
 
 NY State Department of Education - Reports for Brighton Central School District
 New York State School Boards Association

School districts in New York (state)
Education in Monroe County, New York